Drummond is a Scottish surname and clan name. Notable people with the surname include:

Adam Drummond (politician) (1713–1786), Scottish merchant, banker and British Member of Parliament
Adam Humphrey Drummond, 17th Baron Strange (born 1953), British Army major and Baron Strange in the English peerage
Alice Drummond (1928–2016), American actress
Andre Drummond (born 1993), American basketball player
Andrew Drummond (disambiguation), including:
Andrew Drummond (artist), New Zealand painter and sculptor
Andrew Drummond (author), Scottish translator and novelist
Andrew Drummond (banker), Scottish founder of the Drummond Bank in Charing Cross, London
Andrew L. Drummond, chief of the United States Secret Service 
Bill Drummond (born 1953), South African-born Scottish musician, member of the British music duo The KLF
Brian Drummond (born 1969), Canadian voice actor
Carlos Drummond de Andrade (1902–1987), Brazilian poet
Dan Drummond (1891–1949), Scottish footballer
David Drummond (born 1963), American Chief Legal Officer of Alphabet, Inc.
Dean Drummond (1949–2013), American composer and musician
Des Drummond (1958–2022), Jamaican-born English rugby league footballer
Don Drummond (1932–1969), Jamaican trombonist and member of The Skatalites
Dontario Drummond (born 1997), American football player
Dugald Drummond (1840–1912), Scottish locomotive engineer, latterly of the London & South Western Railway
Eddie Drummond, American football player
 Edward Drummond, 6th Duke of Perth (died 1760), titular 9th Earl of Perth, 1st Duke's 3rd son
Edward Drummond (1792-1843), British civil servant who was Personal Secretary to Sir Robert Peel and was fatally shot by Daniel McNaughton in 1843
Flick Drummond (born 1962), British politician
Flora Drummond (1878–1949), British suffragette
 Sergeant Major Francis Drummond, Argentine naval officer who died in the Battle of Monte Santiago during the Cisplatine War
Francisco Ferreira Drummond (1796–1858), historian, palaeograph, musician, and politician of the Azores
Gentner Drummond, American politician
Gordon Drummond (1772–1852), British army general
Gordon Drummond (cricketer) (born 1980), Scottish cricket player
Harriet Drummond (born 1952), American politician
Henry Drummond (disambiguation)
Henry Drummond (1730–1795), British Member of Parliament for Midhurst
Henry Drummond (1762–1794), British Member of Parliament for Castle Rising
Henry Drummond (1786–1860), English banker, Member of Parliament for West Surrey, writer and Irvingite
Henry Drummond (evangelist) (1851–1897), Scottish evangelist, writer and lecturer
Isabelle Drummond (born 1994), Brazilian actress
 Sir Jack Drummond (1891–1952), British biochemist and nutritionist, responsible for nutrition during World War II rationing
James Drummond (disambiguation), including:
James Drummond (artist) (1816–1877), Scottish-born artist
James Drummond (Australian politician) (1814–1873), member of the Western Australian Legislative Council (1870–73)
James Drummond (bishop) (1629–1695), Bishop of Brechin
James Drummond (botanist) (ca. 1786–1863), Scottish-born botanist and naturalist, early settler in Western Australia
James Drummond (chaplain) (died 1699), Scottish chaplain
James Eric Drummond, 16th Earl of Perth (1876–1951), British diplomat, first secretary-general of the League of Nations
James Lawson Drummond (1783–1853), Irish physician, naturalist and botanist 
James Mackay Drummond (1869–1940), New Zealand journalist, naturalist and writer
James Ramsay Drummond (1851–1921), civil servant in India, and amateur botanist
James Robert Drummond (1812–1895), Scottish naval officer, captain of part of the Mediterranean Fleet during the Crimean War
James S. Drummond (died 1881), mayor of Victoria, British Columbia
Jervis Drummond, (born 1976), Costa Rican footballer
John Drummond (disambiguation), including:
John Drummond, 15th Baron Strange (1900–82), of Megginch Castle, Scotland, author, farmer, politician
John Drummond (arts administrator) (1934–2006), British arts administrator and BBC executive
John Drummond (Australian settler) (1816–1906), settler of Western Australia
Johnston Drummond (1820–45), early settler of Western Australia, botanical and zoological collector
Jon Drummond (composer) (born 1969), Australian composer
Jonathan "Jon" Drummond (born 1968), American athlete
José Aurélio Drummond Jr. (born c. 1964), Brazilian businessman
Juan Bennett Drummond (1864–1926), African American physician
Kate Drummond, Canadian actress
Kurtis Drummond, American football player
Lorna Drummond, Scottish lawyer
Luizinho Drummond (1940–2020), Brazilian illegal lottery operator
Margaret Drummond (circa 1340 – after 1375), Queen of Scotland, and wife of David II
Orlando Drummond (1919–2021), Brazilian actor and comedian
Peter Drummond (disambiguation), including:
Peter Drummond (engineer) (1850–1918), Scottish locomotive superintendent
Peter Drummond (physicist), Australian physicist
Peter Drummond (politician) (1931–2013), Australian politician
Peter Drummond (RAF officer) (1894–1945), Australian-born commander in the Royal Air Force
Peter Robert Drummond (1802–1879), Scottish businessman and biographer
 Peter Drummond (born 1969), former National Chairman of the Architectural Heritage Society of Scotland
Pete Drummond (born 1943), British voice artist and former BBC and pirate radio disc jockey and announcer
Pete Drummond (drummer), Australian drummer and composer
Ralph Drummond (1792–1872), Presbyterian minister in South Australia
Ray Drummond (born 1946), American jazz bassist
Ree Drummond (born 1969), American food writer
Ron Drummond, Scottish-American writer, editor, and scholar
Ross Drummond, Scottish golfer
Ryan Drummond, American voice actor
Scott Drummond, British golfer
Thomas Drummond (disambiguation), including
Thomas Drummond (botanist) (1793–1835), Scottish botanical collector
Thomas Drummond (judge) (1809–1890), American judge
Thomas Drummond, Lord Drummond (1742–1780), Scottish landowner and diplomat
Tom Drummond (footballer) (1897–1970), Australian rules footballer
Tom Drummond (musician) (born 1969), American musician, bassist for Better Than Ezra
Vance Drummond (1927–1967), New Zealand-born Australian pilot in Korean and Vietnam Wars
Victoria Drummond (1894–1978) (daughter of the 15th Baron Strange), first woman in the UK to qualify as a marine engineer
Violet Hilda Drummond (1911–2000), British author and illustrator
William Drummond (disambiguation), including:
William Drummond of Hawthornden (1585–1649), Scottish poet, aristocrat and friend of Ben Jonson
William Drummond, 1st Viscount Strathallan (1617–1688), Scottish soldier and politician
William Drummond, 4th Viscount Strathallan (1690–1746, Battle of Culloden), Major-General in the Jacobite cause, brother of Andrew Drummond

Fictional characters
Bulldog Drummond, British fictional detective
Esther Drummond, character in Torchwood: Miracle Day
 Henry Drummond, fictional character from Inherit the Wind
 Pete Drummond, character in Humans

Scottish toponymic surnames
English-language surnames